Gandra is a city and parish in Portugal, part of the municipality of Paredes. The population in 2011 was 6,974, in an area of 11.76 km². It was promoted to a city in 2003.

References

Cities in Portugal
Freguesias of Paredes, Portugal